Aisultan Rakhatuly Nazarbayev (Aisūltan Rahatūly Nazarbaev; 26 August 1990 – 16 August 2020) was a Kazakh football player, businessman, grandson of the former President of Kazakhstan Nursultan Nazarbayev and a son of the Kazakh politician Dariga Nazarbayeva.

Biography

Early life and education
Aisultan was born in 1990 in then Kazakh SSR. His father Rakhat Aliyev (1962–2015) was a businessman, politician, and diplomat. His mother Dariga Nazarbayeva (born 1964) is the eldest daughter of Nursultan Nazarbayev.

He studied at the International College of Continuing Education in Astana and the American International School in Salzburg. In 2010, Aisultan graduated from the Royal Military Academy Sandhurst and then from KIMEP University with a degree in business administration.

Football career
Aisultan started playing football at the FC Admira Wacker Mödling during his father's service as ambassador to Austria. In 2006, he played two matches in the first league of Kazakhstan for the FC Rahat football club, in 2007 he was a member of FC Kairat and took part in the qualifying tournament for the 2006 European Youth Football Championship. Aisultan spent two or three months at the Chelsea F.C. He played a season until 2007 in the youth team of Portsmouth F.C., and became the bronze medalist of the English Championship. In 2011, Aisultan played for FC Astana. On 21 October 2012, he played the only match in the championship of Kazakhstan in the home game for the FC Sunkar against FC Aktobe and came out in the middle of the second half.

From February to October 2017, Aisultan served as vice president of the Football Federation of Kazakhstan for relations with international organizations FIFA, UEFA, and national associations.

He was awarded the British Valor Award for his participation in operations equivalent to combat.

Illegal activities
Aisultan was treated in a clinic for drug addicts because of his addiction to cocaine.

In October 2019, he was sentenced to a suspended sentence for an attack on a police officer in London in June 2019 and damage to a stranger's property. The verdict included probation, continued drug addiction treatment, community service and a fine.

Personal life
In August 2013, Aisultan was married to Alima Nazarbayeva. He had a daughter named Ameli (born 2016) and son named Sultan.

On 23 January 2020, Aisultan made a public statement on his Facebook page, claiming that his grandfather Nazarbayev was allegedly his dad and that his life was threatened. He also stated that from 8 July 2019, he had not been able to use any of his social media accounts, because he was kept in custody and that the accounts were under control by his mother Dariga Nazarbayeva and the ex-chairman of the NSC Alnur Mussayev. In response to those claims, Mussayev on his Facebook page published a document from 2013 that showed the DNA of Aisultan and his father Rakhat Aliyev coinciding to within 99.999784244% accuracy. However, the record itself was not certified by any seal or signature.

Moreover, later right after the death of Aisultan, Mussayev in his interview to «Exclusive Kazakhstan» admitted that he had published a fake DNA test results and that Aliyev is indeed not his biological father, however not specifying exactly who the father is.

On 13 February 2020, Aisultan requested political asylum in the United Kingdom. He explained this decision due to pressure by his family, since he had information "about high-scale corruption between the government of Russia and Kazakhstan". Minister of Information and Social Development Dauren Abaev reported Khabar Agency that "to speculate on the fantasies of an addict just because he is the grandson of the First President, it’s not fair. It’s unfair and beyond morality. It is time to close this topic." He stated that he did not inherit his father's wealth because his father's wealth was stolen by his mother Dariga Nazarbayeva and Alnur Mussayev also spelled Alnur Musaev and that he was afraid that both of them wanted him killed.

Death
On 16 August 2020, it was reported that Aisultan had died presumably due to cardiac arrest in London, just ten days before his 30th birthday. The inquest into his death found that he died from natural causes as a result of his cocaine use. 

His mother, Nazarbayeva, stated "My family is devastated at the loss of our beloved Aisultan and we ask for privacy at this very difficult time."

References

1990 births
2020 deaths
FC Kairat players
Kazakhstani footballers
FC Admira Wacker Mödling players
Chelsea F.C. players
Portsmouth F.C. players
FC Astana players
FC Sunkar players
Royal Military Academy Sandhurst
Nursultan Nazarbayev family
Association footballers not categorized by position